Suffascar is a genus of Malagasy ant spiders first described by A. Henrard & Rudy Jocqué in 2017.

Species
 it contains twelve species:
Suffascar albolineatus Henrard & Jocqué, 2017 — Madagascar
Suffascar fianara Henrard & Jocqué, 2017 — Madagascar
Suffascar fisheri Henrard & Jocqué, 2017 — Madagascar
Suffascar fitzpatrickae Henrard & Jocqué, 2017 — Madagascar
Suffascar gigas Henrard & Jocqué, 2017 — Madagascar
Suffascar griswoldi Henrard & Jocqué, 2017 — Madagascar
Suffascar macromma Henrard & Jocqué, 2017 — Madagascar
Suffascar micromma Henrard & Jocqué, 2017 — Madagascar
Suffascar nonus Henrard & Jocqué, 2017 — Madagascar
Suffascar scutatus Henrard & Jocqué, 2017 — Madagascar
Suffascar sufficiens Henrard & Jocqué, 2017 — Madagascar
Suffascar tofti Henrard & Jocqué, 2017 — Madagascar

References

External links

Araneomorphae genera
Zodariidae